Harry Slater (born  – death unknown) was a rugby union, and professional rugby league footballer who played in the 1900s and 1910s.

Playing career

County honours
Harry Slater won cap(s) for Yorkshire (RL) while at Wakefield Trinity.

Challenge Cup Final appearances
Harry Slater played , and was captain in Wakefield Trinity's 17−0 victory over Hull F.C. in the 1909 Challenge Cup Final during the 1908–09 season at Headingley Rugby Stadium, Leeds on Tuesday 20 April 1909, in front of a crowd of 23,587.

Notable tour matches
Harry Slater played  in Wakefield Trinity's 20-13 victory over Australia in the 1908–09 Kangaroo tour of Great Britain match at Belle Vue, Wakefield on Saturday 19 December 1908.

Club career
Harry Slater made his début for Wakefield Trinity during September 1904, he appears to have scored no drop-goals (or field-goals as they are currently known in Australasia), but prior to the 1974–75 season all goals, whether; conversions, penalties, or drop-goals, scored 2-points, consequently prior to this date drop-goals were often not explicitly documented, therefore '0' drop-goals may indicate drop-goals not recorded, rather than no drop-goals scored. In addition, prior to the 1949–50 season, the archaic field-goal was also still a valid means of scoring points.

References

External links
Search for "Slater" at rugbyleagueproject.org

English rugby league players
Place of birth missing
Place of death missing
Rugby league five-eighths
Rugby league halfbacks
Wakefield Trinity captains
Wakefield Trinity players
Year of birth uncertain
Year of death missing
Yorkshire rugby league team players